Borderline is a 1950 American crime film noir directed by William A. Seiter and starring Fred MacMurray and Claire Trevor. It was filmed from late May to early July 1949 at Republic Studios.

Plot
Pete Ritchie (Raymond Burr) runs a narcotics smuggling operation to the US from Mexico, which the Los Angeles Police Department and the US federal government have unsuccessfully tried to stop. Because of Ritchie's careful operating procedures, US authorities haven't even been able to find out the identities of his sources or customers and are desperate for a breakthrough. As a last resort, Madeleine Haley (Claire Trevor), an LAPD officer and former OSS operative, is sent undercover to Mexico to charm her way into Ritchie's confidence.

Once there, Haley manages to establish contact with Ritchie's gang, but is kidnapped by Johnny Macklin (Fred MacMurray), a federal agent posing as a hoodlum working for a rival of Ritchie's and who also steals a load of Ritchie's narcotics. Haley is unaware that he is also undercover. She joins Macklin on a smuggling trip to maintain her cover and nab Macklin and the ring, all while Ritchie is in hot pursuit.

Cast
Character names are not indicated in on-screen cast credits

Production
The film was based on a story by Norman Krasna. The budget was kept down by the key creatives deferring their pay.

Evaluation in film guides
Steven H. Scheuer's TV Movie Almanac & Ratings 1958 & 1959 gives Borderline a "Fair" rating of 2 stars (out of 4), summarizing its plot as "[A] policewoman is sent to get the goods on dope smugglers working from Los Angeles to Mexico" with the evaluation, "[U]ncertain melodrama wavers between seriousness and farce, is successful at neither". 35 years later, in the 1993–1994 edition, the plot was revised to "[A] policewoman goes undercover as a chorus girl to crack a ring of drug smugglers".

Leonard Maltin's TV Movies & Video Guide (1989 edition) slightly raises the rating to 2½ stars (out of 4) and concludes that "Trevor and MacMurray work well together as law enforcers each tracking down dope smugglers on Mexican border, neither knowing the other isn't a crook". By the time of the third edition (2015) of Maltin's Classic Movie Guide, the rating had been lowered to the Scheuer level of 2 and the write-up changed to "[O]dd thriller-comedy in which L.A. cop Trevor attempts to gather evidence against wily drug smuggler Burr while mixing with tough guy MacMurray in Mexico. Starts out promisingly, but soon bogs down in silliness. Burr makes a vivid villain."

See also
 Public domain film
 List of American films of 1950
 List of films in the public domain in the United States

References

External links
 
 
 
 
 
 

1950 films
Film noir
1950 crime drama films
1950 romantic drama films
American black-and-white films
1950s English-language films
Universal Pictures films
Films directed by William A. Seiter
Films set in Mexico
American romantic drama films
American crime drama films
Films scored by Hans J. Salter
1950s American films